Janice Chiang (born December 28, 1955) is an American comic-book letterer with over thirty years’ experience in the industry.

Career
Chiang broke into comics in the mid-1970s, freelancing for Marvel Comics. Her career really took off in 1981, and throughout the 1980s and up until the mid-1990s she kept extremely busy, often lettering up to ten books a month. Titles Chiang has been particularly associated with include Transformers, Visionaries, Rom, Conan the Barbarian (1982–1990), Alpha Flight (1987–1994), Iron Man (1987–1990), Ghost Rider vol. 2 (1990–1996), What If? (1990–1995), and Impulse (1999–2002). Since the late 1990s her credits have not been as frequent, but she has maintained a steady output. Chiang's manga lettering work on series CHIKYU MISAKI and EMMA were both honored by being chosen as book of the month by NewType magazine which reviewed new anime and manga releases.

Presently, Chiang is working with Stan Lee's POW!Entertainment, Storm King Comics John Carpenter's ASYLUM, John Carpenter's Tales For A HalloweeNight V1 and V2,  and John Carpenter's Tales of Science Fiction VAULT series, DC Entertainment in the comic branch lettering DC SUPER HERO GIRLS graphic novels and digital stories, Pete Ford of Resolution Independent, and various independent projects.

Comics Alliance honored Chiang as Outstanding Letterer of 2016 and ComicBook.com gave her the 2017 Golden Issue Award for Lettering. In May 2017, Chiang was featured as one of 13 women who have been making comics since before the internet on the blog Women Write About Comics. She was also quoted in a New York Times article about veteran Marvel inker Joe Sinnott. Biography in DC WOMEN IN ACTION https://www.chroniclebooks.com/products/dc-women-of-actionIn celebration of Asian American Pacific Islander Month MARVEL VOICES 2022 https://aiptcomics.com/2022/05/16/marvels-voices-identity-2022-1-review-2/

Personal life

Chiang lives in upstate New York.

Notes

References 
Grand Comics Database search results

External links

Living people
People from New York (state)
1955 births
American female comics artists